Bryan Silas (born June 13, 1987) is an American professional stock car racing driver. He has competed in the Hooters Pro Cup Series and ARCA Racing Series in the past, and also recently competed in the NASCAR Camping World Truck Series, driving the No. 99 Chevrolet Silverado for T3R Motorsports.

Personal life
Silas was born in West Palm Beach, Florida, and currently resides in Stuart. He married the former Misty Vance in 2010; they have two sons.

Racing career
Silas began his professional racing career in 2006, making his debut in the ARCA Re/MAX Series at Berlin Raceway in Michigan, finishing 34th; he would run five additional ARCA races that year, with a best finish of 16th at Toledo Speedway. He also competed in a single Hooters Pro Cup Series event at USA International Speedway in Lakeland, Florida, finishing 32nd.

For the 2007 racing season, Silas fan the full ARCA Re/MAX Series schedule; he scored his first top ten in the series at Lakeland, and posted a best finish of 8th at Salem Speedway and Kentucky Speedway en route to a 9th-place finish in the series standings. He also ran three Pro Cup Series events with a best finish of 21st, and made his debut in the Grand-Am KONI Challenge Series, driving for TRG Motorsports at New Jersey Motorsports Park and finishing 14th.

Silas spent the next three years competing in ARCA for car owner Andy Hillenburg and for various owners in Pro Cup; his best finish in ARCA competition being a fourth at Rockingham Speedway in 2009, and his best finish in points being sixth that same season. Silas ran a limited schedule in ARCA and Pro Cup in 2011 for a variety of owners; in his final ARCA race of the year, at Iowa Speedway in July, Silas drove the No. 11 Chevrolet that was being used for filming the movie Heartland, starring Zac Efron and Dennis Quaid; Efron had driven the same car early in the day for filming that Silas drove to 16th place in the event. Later that year he scored his first win in a major stock car event, winning the American 200 at Rockingham Speedway in the USA Racing Pro Cup Series, using pit strategy to secure the win.

NASCAR
Silas made his debut in NASCAR competition in the Craftsman Truck Series at Kansas Speedway in April 2007; he ran a limited schedule in the series that year, and again over the next four seasons, posting a career-best finish of 16th at Daytona International Speedway in the series' season-opening event in 2009.

For the 2012 season, Silas moved to the Camping World Truck Series full-time in the No. 99 Rockingham Speedway Ford for T3R Motorsports, competing for Rookie of the Year honors in the series.

Silas scored his first top ten in the Camping World Truck Series at Texas in 2014, finishing on the lead lap in 8th. He finished his career best 10th points, collecting two top-tens.

Motorsports career results

NASCAR
(key) (Bold - Pole position awarded by time. Italics - Pole position earned by points standings. * – Most laps led.)

Nationwide Series

Camping World Truck Series

 Season still in progress
 Ineligible for series points

ARCA Racing Series
(key) (Bold – Pole position awarded by qualifying time. Italics – Pole position earned by points standings or practice time. * – Most laps led.)

References

External links
 
 

Living people
1987 births
People from Stuart, Florida
Racing drivers from Florida
NASCAR drivers
ARCA Menards Series drivers
CARS Tour drivers